Zevin (also, Zovin, Zëvin, and Zovik) is a village and municipality in the Yardymli Rayon of Azerbaijan.  It has a population of 1,322.

Notes

References 

Populated places in Yardimli District